Tourrettes is a commune in the Var department in the Provence-Alpes-Côte d'Azur region in southeastern France.

Tourrettes is one of a series of "perched villages" overlooking the plain between the southern Alps and the Esterel massif, which borders the sea between Cannes and Saint-Raphaël. Tourrettes is popular with tourists. The village is located on the road to Mons, which later on joins the Route Napoléon (linking Nice to Grenoble through the Alps).

In the recent years a high-standing golf resort has settled in Tourrettes, the Domaine de Terre Blanche.

The aerodrome of Fayence-Tourrettes was one of the most active in Europe.

Geography

Climate

Tourrettes has a hot-summer Mediterranean climate (Köppen climate classification Csa).

See also
Communes of the Var department

References

External links

Homepage Commune de Tourrettes
More info
Gliding at Fayence-Tourrettes Airfield

Communes of Var (department)